James Lawrence Clinton (August 10, 1850 – September 3, 1921), nicknamed "Big Jim", was an outfielder in Major League Baseball. He played ten seasons in three major leagues. He also managed the Brooklyn Eckfords for a short time in 1872, losing all 11 games he managed. Following his playing career, Clinton managed minor league teams in Birmingham, Nashville, and Manchester and worked at a Brooklyn hotel. In 1896 he earned $10,000 from the sale of four lots in Oakland, California he had purchased with teammate John Farrow during their playing days. By 1920, Clinton was an inmate of the Kings Park Psychiatric Center. He died there on September 3, 1921.

References

External links

Baseball players from New York (state)
Major League Baseball left fielders
Major League Baseball center fielders
19th-century baseball players
Baseball player-managers
Brooklyn Eckfords players
Brooklyn Eckfords managers
Elizabeth Resolutes players
Brooklyn Atlantics players
Louisville Grays players
Worcester Ruby Legs players
Baltimore Orioles (AA) players
Cincinnati Red Stockings (AA) players
1850 births
1921 deaths
Minor league baseball managers
Syracuse Stars (minor league baseball) players
Pittsburgh Allegheny players
New Bedford (minor league baseball) players
New Haven (minor league baseball) players
Hartford (minor league baseball) players
Albany (minor league baseball) players
New York Metropolitans (minor league) players
Jersey City Jerseys players
Nashville Blues players
Birmingham Ironmakers players
Manchester Maroons players
Burials at Calvary Cemetery (Queens)